First Baptist Church is a historic church in Cumberland, Allegany County, Maryland.  It is a T-shaped gable-front brick structure of one and a half stories, with a white glazed brick facade that was added in 1917 to the existing church structure erected in 1849.  The architecture is a modest interpretation of the late Gothic Revival style.

It was listed on the National Register of Historic Places in 1980.

References

External links
, including photo from 1977, at Maryland Historical Trust

Baptist churches in Maryland
Churches in Allegany County, Maryland
Buildings and structures in Cumberland, Maryland
Churches on the National Register of Historic Places in Maryland
Churches completed in 1849
19th-century Baptist churches in the United States
1849 establishments in Maryland
National Register of Historic Places in Allegany County, Maryland